Peter Kalafut (born 19 October 1960 in Kežmarok) is a Slovak former handball player who competed in the 1992 Summer Olympics.

References

1960 births
Living people
Slovak male handball players
Olympic handball players of Czechoslovakia
Czechoslovak male handball players
Handball players at the 1992 Summer Olympics
People from Kežmarok
Sportspeople from the Prešov Region